Pinchas Rosen (born Felix Rosenblüth, 1 May 1887 – 3 May 1978) was an Israeli statesman, and the country's first Minister of Justice, serving three times during 1948–51, 1952–56, and 1956–61. He was also leader of the Independent Liberals during the 1960s.

Biography
Felix Pinchas Rosenblüth (later Rosen) was born in Berlin, Germany. He was brought up in Messingwerk Finow and attended the Wilhelms Gymnasium in Eberswalde from 1892 to 1904. In 1905 he left to study law at the universities of Freiburg and Berlin, graduating in 1908. He served in the Imperial German Army in World War I. Always active in Zionist circles, Rosen was Chairman of the Zionist Federation of Germany from 1920 to 1923, and eventually migrated to Mandatory Palestine in 1926 where he practiced as a lawyer and helped create the Central European Immigrants Association.

Rosen was married three times, first to Annie Lesser with whom he had two children, Hans and Dina, who with their mother settled in London in 1933 and whom Rosen visited regularly until the end of his life. In 1935 he married Hadassah Calvary with whom he had a daughter, Rivka, who died in 1942 aged seven; Hadassah died of cancer in 1945. In 1950 he married Johanna Rosenfeld (born Ettlinger) who also predeceased him. Through his second and third wives he gained four step sons.

Political career
In 1942 Rosen founded the New Aliyah Party, and was elected to the Assembly of Representatives on its list in 1944. In 1948 he was among the signatories of the Declaration of the Establishment of the State of Israel, which he helped create. (In 2019 Israel's Supreme Court ruled that drafts of the declaration, commissioned by Rosen from fellow-lawyer Mordechai Beham, were of national importance and State, not private, property).

In the 1949 elections, the New Aliyah Party became the Progressive Party, winning Rosen a seat in the Knesset. In 1950, when David Ben-Gurion was unable to form a coalition, the President gave the task to Rosen, as head of the Progressive Party. Rosen handed the reins to Mapai, recognizing its indispensability.

Rosen became the country's first Minister of Justice, an office to which he brought a strong reputation for intellect and probity. He retained his seat and Ministerial position in the 1951, 1955 and 1959 elections. Soon after the 1959 election the Progressive Party merged with the General Zionists to form the Liberal Party.

The new party won the third largest number of seats in the 1961 elections but was not invited into the coalition, and Rosen lost his ministerial position. In order to consolidate opposition to Mapai's hegemony within Israeli politics, the Liberal Party merged with Herut to form Gahal. Rosen, however, was unhappy with the merger, and led a breakaway of seven MKs to found the Independent Liberals. He was elected to the sixth Knesset but resigned from the Knesset on December 23, 1968, and retired from politics. His departure from the political stage was greeted by one newspaper as, "The end of the aristocracy" and in another by a cartoon captioned: "Another Channukah miracle! ... An MK resigns because of age."

Rosen was a long-term friend of David Ben-Gurion who broke with Rosen after the Lavon affair, a botched Israeli sabotage operation in Egypt, in which Rosen sided with Lavon who had been (almost certainly falsely) accused of masterminding the mission, after which it is said Ben-Gurion refused to talk to Rosen again.

On his death Pinhas Rosen received a state funeral.

Awards
In 1973, Rosen was awarded the Israel Prize, in jurisprudence.

See also
List of Israel Prize recipients

References

External links

1887 births
1978 deaths
Politicians from Berlin
German Jewish military personnel of World War I
German emigrants to Mandatory Palestine
Ministers of Justice of Israel
Members of the Assembly of Representatives (Mandatory Palestine)
Signatories of the Israeli Declaration of Independence
Israel Prize in law recipients
New Aliyah Party politicians
Progressive Party (Israel) politicians
Liberal Party (Israel) politicians
Independent Liberals (Israel) leaders
Members of the 1st Knesset (1949–1951)
Members of the 2nd Knesset (1951–1955)
Members of the 3rd Knesset (1955–1959)
Members of the 4th Knesset (1959–1961)
Members of the 5th Knesset (1961–1965)
Members of the 6th Knesset (1965–1969)
Burials at Nahalat Yitzhak Cemetery
20th-century  Israeli lawyers